The 1844 United States presidential election in New Hampshire took place between November 1 and December 4, 1844, as part of the 1844 United States presidential election. Voters chose six representatives, or electors to the Electoral College, who voted for President and Vice President.

New Hampshire voted for the Democratic candidate, James K. Polk, over Whig candidate Henry Clay and Liberty candidate James G. Birney. Polk won New Hampshire by a margin of 18.9%.

With 8.46% of the popular vote, New Hampshire would prove to be James G. Birney's strongest state.

Results

See also
 United States presidential elections in New Hampshire

References

New Hampshire
1844
1844 New Hampshire elections